This is a list of acts enacted by the Parliament of South Africa from its establishment in 1910 to the present.

 List of Acts of the Parliament of South Africa, 1910–1919
 List of Acts of the Parliament of South Africa, 1920–1929
 List of Acts of the Parliament of South Africa, 1930–1939
 List of Acts of the Parliament of South Africa, 1940–1949
 List of Acts of the Parliament of South Africa, 1950–1959
 List of Acts of the Parliament of South Africa, 1960–1969
 List of Acts of the Parliament of South Africa, 1970–1979
 List of Acts of the Parliament of South Africa, 1980–1989
 List of Acts of the Parliament of South Africa, 1990–1999
 List of Acts of the Parliament of South Africa, 2000–2009
 List of Acts of the Parliament of South Africa, 2010–2019
 List of Acts of the Parliament of South Africa, 2020–2029